Sokhi Tumi Kar (English: Darling you're whose?) (Bengali:  সখি তুমি কার?) is a 1980 Bangladeshi film starring Shabana, Farooque and Razzak. Shabana earned her maiden National Award for Best Actress for the film.

Story
Farooque and Razzak play brothers, while Shabana plays the younger brother's love interest. When the younger brother goes abroad to study, the older brother forcefully marries her.

Cast 
Shabana 
Abdur Razzak
Farooque

Soundtrack
The music was composed by Alam Khan and written by Mukul Chowdhury.

Awards
Bangladesh National Film Awards
Best Actress – Shabana

References

1980 films
Films scored by Alam Khan
Bengali-language Bangladeshi films
1980s Bengali-language films